Doto rosacea is a species of sea slug, a nudibranch, a marine gastropod mollusc in the family Dotidae.

Distribution
This species was described from Sagami Bay, Japan.

Description
The body of this nudibranch is mottled with rose-pink on a pale pink background with clusters of white dots along the middle of the back. The cerata have elongate tubercles and are also rose-pink in colour.

EcologyDoto rosacea'' feeds on a hydroid, probably family Aglaopheniidae.

References

External links

Dotidae
Gastropods described in 1949